Blaster is the only studio album by American rock band Scott Weiland and the Wildabouts, as well as Weiland's final album to be recorded and released during his lifetime. The album was released on March 31, 2015, by Softdrive Records. The album was supported by the singles "White Lightning", "Way She Moves" and "20th Century Boy". Guitarist Jeremy Brown died one day before the album's release, on March 30, 2015.  During the tour to support the album, Weiland was found dead on the band's tour bus on December 3, 2015.

Background
In a January 2015, interview Scott Weiland explained that he hadn't felt this excited about making an album since the early days of Stone Temple Pilots, saying: "If you take out the fact that we had to break up the recording process when touring, the album came very easily because of the vibe between the band members. The sound we were getting felt original and infectious and brought me back to the feelings I had when I made my first couple records. Just excitement, feeling invigorated. Youthful."

Singles
The album's first single "White Lightning" was released on January 13, 2015. The album's second single "Way She Moves" was released on February 10, 2015. The album's third single "20th Century Boy" was released on February 24, 2015.

Critical reception

Blaster received mixed reviews from music critics. At Metacritic, which assigns a normalized rating out of 100 to reviews from critics, the album received an average score of 57, which indicates "mixed or average reviews", based on 7 reviews. Dan Bogosian of Consequence of Sound said, "Scott Weiland spent so much time as a one-trick pony. Even in his softest work with Stone Temple Pilots and Velvet Revolver, his tunes could be best described as “guitar-heavy” and “furry.” Blaster is no different, though he has gone more glam than before. By the standards of the Weiland of old, Blaster falls softly short; its best flavors come from the handful of new touches." Stephen Thomas Erlewine of AllMusic said, "With such a familiar palette, details matter and the aptly titled Blaster lacks in subtlety. Much of it churns at crackling digital overdrive, sounding brutal, loud, and ugly, but beneath that gnarled surface, Weiland can still deliver the kind of candied hooks that keep him firmly situated as a guilty pleasure. Usually, these hooks grab hold on the lightest songs: the snaky sway of "Way She Moves," the icy new romanticism of "Youth Quake," and, especially, "Beach Pop," a piece of sticky AM bubblegum pop that earns its handclaps." Kory Grow of Rolling Stone said, "With Stone Temple Pilots, Scott Weiland was one of grunge's greatest singers, crooning and growling in equal measure. His husky howls were also one of the super-ingredients in Velvet Revolver. But on most of Blaster, Weiland's first all-new solo album since 2008, he suffers from a bad case of Generic Rock Voice, firing off gravelly clichés like, "In the nick of time/I was taken by surprise by this girl of mine" ("Amethyst")."

Track listing

Personnel
 Scott Weiland – lead vocals, rhythm guitar, keyboards
 Jeremy Brown – lead guitar
 Tommy Black – bass, backing vocals
 Danny Thompson – drums
 Mike Avenaim - drums (tracks 1, 4, 6, 8)
 James Iha - rhythm guitar (track 6)

Charts

References

2015 albums
Scott Weiland albums
Softdrive Records albums